Getting Even is a 1909 American silent short comedy film directed by D. W. Griffith. A print of the film exists in the film archive of the Library of Congress.

Cast
Billy Quirk - Bud
Mary Pickford - Miss Lucy
James Kirkwood - Jim Blake
Edwin August
Florence Barker
Kate Bruce - Party Guest
Verner Clarges - Party Guest
John R. Cumpson - miner
Arthur V. Johnson - Party Guest
Florence La Badie
George Nichols - miner
Anthony O'Sullivan - miner
Lottie Pickford - Party Guest
Gertrude Robinson - Party Guest
Mack Sennett - miner
Henry B. Walthall - miner

References

External links
 

1909 comedy films
1909 films
Silent American comedy films
American silent short films
American black-and-white films
Films directed by D. W. Griffith
1909 short films
Articles containing video clips
American comedy short films
1900s American films
1900s English-language films